The Prodigal Woman (Spanish:La pródiga) is a 1946 Spanish drama film directed by Rafael Gil and starring Rafael Durán, Paola Barbara and Juan Espantaleón.

Synopsis 
Three young candidates for parliament arrive in a town where a bankrupt marchioness is the most influential person. This woman with an adventurous past now lives in ruins because she practices charity with the entire town, hence she is known as "the prodigal". Between her and the idealistic Guillermo a love arises.

Cast

References

Bibliography
 de España, Rafael. Directory of Spanish and Portuguese film-makers and films. Greenwood Press, 1994.

External links 

1946 films
1946 drama films
Spanish drama films
1940s Spanish-language films
Films based on works by Pedro Antonio de Alarcón
Films directed by Rafael Gil
Suevia Films films
Films scored by Juan Quintero Muñoz
Films produced by Cesáreo González
Spanish black-and-white films
1940s Spanish films